English singer and songwriter Seal has released ten studio albums, four live albums, two compilation albums, forty-three singles and four video albums.

From 1994 to 2016, Seal has had 13 singles that charted on the US Adult Contemporary chart, two of which peaked at number one.

Albums

Studio albums

Notes
 There are two different versions of the 1991 debut album; for details see album's article.
 The subsequent 1994 album bears the same title as the debut, not to be confused with the debut's two versions; to avoid confusion, it is sometimes referred to as Seal II.

Live albums

Compilation albums

Box sets

Singles

As featured artist

Other appearances

Videography

Video albums

Music videos

Notes

References

 
Discographies of British artists
Pop music discographies
Rhythm and blues discographies